Hollinwell and Annesley (previously Hollin Well and Annesley) railway station is a former station on the Great Central Railway on the section from Nottingham Victoria to Sheffield Victoria. The station was opened in November 1901 and closed in September 1962. It was one of the earliest closures on the section from Nottingham to Sheffield.

History
The station halt initially-known as Hollin Well and Annesley opened on the London extension of the Great Central Railway on 1 November 1901, serving Notts Golf Club's then new Hollinwell golf course; the club had guaranteed £200 a year in receipts. The station was on the south edge of the golf course with no road access, and had two wooden platforms and a wood footbridge.  Initially, two trains a day serving the station were timetabled in Bradshaw's Guide, but the station soon became excluded from timetables, presumably for private use. By 1941, the spelling had changed to Hollinwell. It closed on 10 September 1962.

Present day
The station has been demolished and no traces remain at the site.

Former services

References

External links
 Annesley images at RCTS

Former Great Central Railway stations
1901 establishments in England
1962 disestablishments in England
Railway stations in Great Britain opened in 1901
Railway stations in Great Britain closed in 1962